Bob Grant (26 April 1934 – 25 June 2007) was an Australian athlete. He competed in the men's javelin throw at the 1956 Summer Olympics.

References

1934 births
2007 deaths
Athletes (track and field) at the 1956 Summer Olympics
Australian male javelin throwers
Olympic athletes of Australia
People from Shepparton